The International Mobile Gaming Awards ("IMGA") is an annual competition and awards ceremony that honors outstanding games made for mobile devices. It is the longest standing international competition for mobile games. Notable IMGA winners include Candy Crush Saga and Monument Valley.

The best mobile games submissions are awarded at the prize-giving IMGA ceremony, which takes place in various cities across the United States and Asia. IMGA was founded by Maarten Noyons in 2004 and is headquartered in Marseilles, France.

History 
In 2004 the mobile games industry was still finding its feet. As developers began carving out a space in the market, the French division of Discreet announced the first "International 3D Mobile Gaming Competition." With over $50,000 of prizes to be won, the contest was designed by NCC Partners CEO Maarten Noyons to help showcase young mobile games and was supported by Nokia, Orange, Intel, IBM and more.

With 85 entries, the awards took place on 3 February 2004, at the IMAGINA festival in Monte Carlo. There were four categories: Grand Prix, 16MB, 1MB, 200K/native, and 200K/Java. Later that year, Discreet was acquired by Autodesk who decided to close the French office – and thus the competition. However, Noyons convinced Discreet to let him take full control of the event and in doing so he founded IMGA as it's known today.

Renaming the event the International Mobile Gaming Awards, Noyons has grown IMGA into a worldwide competition. Each year, the awards now receive around 1,000 submissions, 600 of which are usually submitted to the jury. Over a two-day judging process, the entrants are whittled down to 60 nominees.

For ten years the winners were announced at the GSMA's Mobile World Congress in Barcelona, but the 11th IMGA saw the ceremony moved to GDC in San Francisco, during the Game Developers Conference and Game Connection.

In 2016, the competition added a new category for VR games and announced 102 nominations and 11 categories. Sam Barlow won the Grand Prix that year with Her Story, a detective game.

After Europe and the US, the IMGA has launched its program in China in 2015 and Southeast Asia in 2016 creating two additional competitions: IMGA Southeast Asia in partnership with Malaysia Digital Economy Corporation (MDEC) and IMGA China in partnership with Migu – China Mobile's digital content entity, and co-hosted by MyGamez, a publisher for foreign mobile games in China.

Judging session 
The judging process takes place in Marseilles, France in January every year. Jury members are invited to review and play all submitted games and select the nominees. The main judging criteria are the mechanics of the gameplay, the quality of the sound design and visual art and the originality in storytelling.

IMGA is open to entries from all mobile games developers. Past participants include students, researchers, artists, individual developers and publishers.
The winners of each of eight category are decided by an international jury of experts and journalists from Asia, the US and Europe.

Past judges include industry veterans such as King's former games guru Tommy Palm, Dean Takahashi of VentureBeat, and Unity Evangelist Oscar Clark

Award Categories 
The awards celebrate innovation and creativity in mobile games worldwide. Based on their merit, games are recognized in a variety of categories that are decided on by the jury, when they meet each year for the judging process. The categories for the 2020 International Mobile Gaming Awards included:

Best AR Game
Best Game for 5G
Best Meaningful Play

Best Quickplay Game
Best Technical Achievement

Best VR Game
Excellence in Art

Excellence in Audio
Excellence in Design

Excellence in Gameplay
Excellence in Innovation
Excellence in Storytelling

Winners 
The following games won the "Grand Prix" at their respective IMGA ceremonies, the award that recognises the best mobile game of that year's nominees.

Aside from the main categories and the Grand Prix, there are two more prizes. These include the "People's Choice" award, which was introduced in 2008, for the game that receives the most votes from the general public; while the jury's "Honorable Mention" was introduced in 2012, for the game the judges believe deserves extra credit.

2020

2019

2018

2017

2016

2015

2014

2013

2012

2011

2009

2008

2007

2006

2005

2004

References

External links 
 
 International Mobile Gaming Awards channel at YouTube

Awards established in 2004
Video game awards